The Satanist is the tenth studio album by Polish extreme metal band Behemoth. The album was announced on 31 May 2013 and released on 3 February 2014, through Nuclear Blast and on 4 February in Poland via Metal Blade Records and Mystic Production, respectively. Release was preceded by digital download single "Blow Your Trumpets Gabriel" and 12" EP under the same title released on 4 December 2013.

Background and history

The Satanist was recorded between February and June 2013 in Hertz Studio in Białystok, and RG Studio in Gdańsk, both in Poland, produced by Behemoth, Daniel Bergstrand, and the Wiesławscy Brothers. The album was mixed by Matt Hyde at Hydeaway Studios in Los Angeles, and mastered by Ted Jensen at Sterling Sound in New York City. Colin Richardson was the initial producer for the album, but stepped down after four weeks due to creative differences.

A music video was shot for the song "Blow Your Trumpets Gabriel" which was produced and directed by Grupa 13, and Dariusz Szermanowicz. The video premiered on the Behemoth YouTube channel on 3 December 2013.

On 7 January 2014, Behemoth released the first part of their video prologue for this album. Subsequently, the second part was released on January, 14, the third part was released on January, 21, and the fourth part was released on January, 29. Earlier, on 28 January, the official lyric video for the song "Ora Pro Nobis Lucifer" was released.

The song "In the Absence ov Light" contains a spoken word quote from the Witold Gombrowicz drama The Marriage (pol. Ślub) which states:

Critical reception and legacy

Upon its release, The Satanist received universal acclaim reviews from music critics. At Metacritic, which assigns a normalized rating out of 100 to reviews from critics, the album received an average score of 92, which indicates "universal acclaim", based on 10 reviews. Joe DiVita of Loudwire noted that the album "sees the band shed away that skin as they simultaneously get back to some of their blackened roots while exploring new areas with ... dynamic songwriting". The album would claim the top spot on Loudwire's list of the best metal albums of 2014, with Loudwire stating that "The disc is a masterpiece from beginning to end, with absolutely no filler to be skipped over".

Grayson Currin of Pitchfork said "The Satanist is a terrific coil of most everything Behemoth have ever done well, a strangely hopeful vision of hell wrested away from its very grip." The editorial staff of Dutch webzine Lords of Metal named it the third best album of 2014, after a score of 93/100 for the initial album review.

In 2019 the album was voted as the "Best Metal Album of the Decade" by various publications such as Loudwire, Consequence of Sound, and others.

Track listing
All music composed by Nergal. All arrangements by Behemoth. All lyrics written by Nergal, except where noted.

Personnel
Production and performance credits are adapted from the album liner notes.

Behemoth
Adam "Nergal" Darski – lead guitar, vocals, lyrics
Tomasz "Orion" Wróblewski – bass
Zbigniew Robert "Inferno" Promiński – drums
Production
Wojciech Wiesławski – producer, engineering
Sławomir Wiesławski – producer, engineering
Daniel Bergstrand – producer
Matt Hyde – mixing
Ted Jensen – mastering
Urban Näsvall – drum technician
Denis "Forkas" Kostromitin (Денис "Форкас" Костромитин) – cover art
Metastazis (Jean-Emmanuel "Valnoir" Simoulin) – additional design
Zbigniew Bielak – additional design
Arkadiusz "Malta" Malczewski – mixing, mastering (DVD)
Grupa 13 – producer (DVD; Documentary)
Aga Krysiuk – filmmaker (DVD; Documentary)
Iwo Ledwozyw – filmmaker (DVD; Documentary)

Additional musicians
Patryk Dominik "Seth" Sztyber – rhythm guitar
Michał Łapaj (Riverside) – keyboards, hammond organ on "O Father O Satan O Sun!" and "The Satanist"
Krzysztof "Siegmar" Oloś (Vesania) – samples
Krzysztof Azarewicz – lyrics
Jan "Dziablas" Galbas (Octopussy) – backing vocals on "O Father O Satan O Sun!"
Artur Jurek (Sanacja) – orchestrations
Marcin Janek (Durys Band) – saxophone on "In the Absence ov Light"
Grażyna Michalec (Polish Chamber Orchestra Sopot) – cello
Magda Miotke-Bajerska (Polish Chamber Orchestra Sopot) – cello  
Alicja Leoniuk-Kit (Polish Chamber Orchestra Sopot) – cello
Pawel Hulisz (Hevelius Brass quintet) – flugelhorn, trumpet
Michał Szczerba (Hevelius Brass quintet) – French horn
Łukasz Lacny (Hevelius Brass quintet) – French horn
Bogdan Kwiatek (Hevelius Brass quintet) – trombone
Adam Sierżęga – percussion (uncredited, track 10; DVD)
Note
Recorded at Hertz Studio in Białystok, Poland, Feb–June 2013
Additional recording at Dug-Out, Radio Gdańsk, Soundsgreat Studio
Mixed at Hydeaway Studio, Los Angeles, Aug–Sept 2013
Mastered at Sterling Sound, New York City, Sept–Oct 2013
'Live Barbarossa' was filmed during Phoenix Rising tour in Ekaterinburg, Russia, Sept 2012

Release history

Charts

References 

2014 albums
Behemoth (band) albums
Metal Blade Records albums
Nuclear Blast albums
Mystic Production albums
Polish-language albums
Albums produced by Adam Darski
Articles containing video clips